Joseph Carryl Seaman Sr., known as J.C. Seaman (December 8, 1898 – June 14, 1964), was a five-term member of the Louisiana House of Representatives from Waterproof in Tensas Parish in northeast Louisiana, having served from 1944 to 1964.

References

1898 births
1964 deaths
Democratic Party members of the Louisiana House of Representatives
People from Waterproof, Louisiana
Businesspeople from Louisiana
American bankers
Deaths from cancer in Louisiana
20th-century American politicians
20th-century American businesspeople
20th-century American Episcopalians